MS Norbank is a ro-ro freight vessel owned and operated by the British ferry company P&O. She was built by Van Der Giessen-de Noord N.V., Netherlands in 1993.

History
The ship was launched as MS Norbank in 1993 and was delivered by October 1993 to Nordzee Verdi Stone BV in The Netherlands and started operating between Hull and Rotterdam for North Sea Ferries. She was chartered to P&O Group in January 1997 and remained on the Rotterdam route where she then transferred to the Felixstowe to Rotterdam route, before going to the Irish Sea to start operating for P&O Irish Sea between Liverpool and Dublin. After P&O Irish Sea was renamed she transferred to P&O Ferries and remained on the Irish Sea where she still remains.

Sister ships

References

External links
MS Norbank - MidShip Photos

Ferries of England
Ferries of Ireland
1993 ships
Ships of P&O Ferries